

Season 
Fans thought of 1987 as a year zero, hoping in a revival from the club. Trapattoni managed to avoid the departures of Altobelli and Zenga while Nobile and Scifo arrived, in add to a return for Serena. Initial results were poor: Inter passed the preliminary stage of the Coppa Italia only due to goal difference, after have finished 4 out of 5 games from penalty spot (with an equal number of wins and losses). Rummenigge left Milan days before Italian league could start with a home loss (0–2) against Pescara, who gained his first win in Serie A on Inter's soil.

The side collected a goalless draw in the UEFA Cup with Beşiktaş, then beaten (3–1) in return match. The next continental opponent was Turun Palloseura, able to win at the San Siro with a single goal. After a 2–1 success over Juventus signed by Serena (former Bianconeri player), Inter also won the second leg. Inter was knocked out in the round of 16 by Espanyol with a 2–1 aggregate. Trapattoni's team managed to reach the semifinal of the domestic cup, but lost to Sampdoria. The Italian league, marked by losses in both citizen derbies, ended with a fifth place useful to get qualification for the UEFA Cup next season.

Squad

Goalkeepers
  Walter Zenga
  Astutillo Malgioglio

Defenders
  Giuseppe Bergomi
  Giuseppe Baresi
  Riccardo Ferri
  Andrea Mandorlini
  Salvatore Nobile
  Fabio Calcaterra
  Daniel Passarella

Midfielders
  Enzo Scifo
  Gianfranco Matteoli
  Alberto Rivolta
  Stefano Civeriati
  Giuseppe Minaudo
  Adriano Piraccini
  Pietro Fanna

Attackers
  Alessandro Altobelli
  Aldo Serena
  Dario Morello
  Massimo Ciocci
  Paolo Mandelli

Competitions

Serie A

Matches

Coppa Italia 

First round

Eightfinals

Quarterfinals

Semifinals

UEFA Cup 

Round of 16

Eightfinals

Statistics

Players statistics 
Appearances and goals in domestic league.

G.Baresi (29/1); Altobelli (28/9); Bergomi (28/1); Fanna (28/1); Scifo (28/4); Mandorlini (27/2); Zenga (26/−31); R.Ferri (25/2); Piraccini (23/1); Ciocci (22/4); A.Serena (22/6); Matteoli (21/1); Passarella (21/6); Nobile (19); Minaudo (15/2); Calcaterra (12); Malgioglio (4/−4); Civeriati (2); Morello (1); Rivolta (1).

References

Sources
  RSSSF - Italy 1987/88

Inter Milan seasons
Internazionale